Corvin Castle, also known as Hunyadi Castle or Hunedoara Castle (Romanian: Castelul Huniazilor or Castelul Corvinilor; Hungarian: Vajdahunyadi vár), is a Gothic-Renaissance castle in Hunedoara, Romania. It is one of the largest castles in Europe and is featured as one of the Seven Wonders of Romania.

History 

Corvin Castle was laid out in 1446, when construction began by order of Voivode of Transylvania John Hunyadi, who wanted to transform the former keep built by Charles I of Hungary. The castle was originally given to John Hunyadi's father, Voyk (Vajk), by Sigismund of Luxembourg, king of Hungary and Croatia, as severance in 1409. It was also in 1446 that John Hunyadi was elected as the regent governor by the Diet. 

The castle has three large areas: the Knight's Hall, the Diet Hall and the circular stairway. The halls are rectangular in shape and are decorated with marble. The Diet Hall was used for ceremonies or formal receptions whilst the Knight's Hall was used for feasts. In 1456, John Hunyadi died and work on the castle stagnated. Starting with 1458, new commissions were being undergone to construct the Matia Wing of the castle. In 1480, work was completely stopped on the castle and it was recognised as being one of the biggest and most impressive buildings in Eastern Europe. 

The 16th century did not bring any improvements to the castle, but during the 17th century new additions were made for aesthetic and military purposes. Aesthetically, the large new palace was built facing the town. A two-level building, it hosted living chambers and a large living area. For military purposes, two new towers were constructed: the White Tower and the Artillery Tower. Also, the external yard was added for administration and storage.

The current castle is the result of a fanciful restoration campaign undertaken after a disastrous fire and many decades of total neglect. It has been noted that modern "architects projected to it their own wistful interpretations of how a great Gothic castle should look". In 2021 Corvin Castle attracted around 276,000 tourists.

Structure 

Built in a Renaissance-Gothic style and constructed over the site of an older fortification on a rock above the smaller Zlaști River, the castle is a large and imposing structure with tall towers, bastions, an inner courtyard, diversely coloured roofs, and myriad windows and balconies adorned with stone carvings. The castle also features a double wall for enhanced fortification and is flanked by both rectangular and circular towers, an architectural innovation for the period's Transylvanian architecture. Some of the towers (the Capistrano Tower, the Deserted Tower and the Drummers' Tower) were used as prisons. The Buzdugan Tower (named after a type of mace) was solely built for defensive purposes and it had its exterior decorated with geometric motifs. The rectangular towers have large openings to accommodate larger weapons.

As one of the most important properties of John Hunyadi, the castle was transformed during his reign. It became a sumptuous home, not only a strategically enforced point. With the passing of the years, the masters of the castle had modified its look, adding towers, halls and guest rooms. The gallery and the keep - the last defense tower (called "Neboisa" which means "Don't be afraid" in Serbo-Croatian), which remained unchanged from John Hunyadi's time, and the Capistrano Tower (named after the saint, Franciscan friar from the Battle of Belgrade in 1456) are some of the most significant parts of the construction. Other significant parts of the building are the Knights' Hall (a great reception hall), the Club Tower, the White bastion, which served as a food storage room, and the Diet Hall, on whose walls medallions are painted (among them there are portraits of Matei Basarab, rulers from Wallachia, and Vasile Lupu, ruler of Moldavia). In the wing of the castle called the Mantle, a painting can be seen which portrays the legend of the raven from which the name of the descendants of John Hunyadi, Corvinus came.

Legacy 

Tourists are told that it was the place where Vlad the Impaler, Prince of Wallachia, was held prisoner by John Hunyadi, Hungary's military leader and regent during the King's minority. Later, Vlad III entered a political alliance with John Hunyadi, although the latter was responsible for the execution of his father, Vlad II Dracul. Because of these links, the Hunedoara Castle is sometimes mentioned as a source of inspiration for Castle Dracula in Bram Stoker's 1897 horror novel Dracula. In fact, Stoker neither knew about Vlad's alliance with Hunyadi, nor about Hunyadi's castle. Instead, Stoker's own handwritten research notes confirm that the novelist imagined Castle Dracula to be situated on an empty top in the Transylvanian Călimani Mountains near the former border with Moldavia.

In the castle yard, near the 15th-century chapel, there is a  well. According to the legend, this fountain was dug by 3 Turkish prisoners to whom liberty was promised if they reached water. After 15 years they completed the well, but their captors did not keep their promise. It is said that the inscription on a wall of the well means "you have water, but not soul". Specialists, however, have translated the inscription as "he who wrote this inscription is Hasan, who lives as slave of the giaours, in the fortress near the church".

A replica of the castle, built in the late 19th century, can be found in Budapest, Hungary.

The final action sequence of the 2015 Bollywood movie Singh Is Bling starring Akshay Kumar  was shot at the castle.

In 2018, the castle was used as the "Cârța Monastery" in the horror movie The Nun.

See also 
 Tourism in Romania
 List of castles in Romania
 Seven Wonders of Romania
 Villages with fortified churches in Transylvania

References

External links 

 Information and images at Historical Text Archive
 Information and images about Corvin Castle at Castelul Corvinilor

Castles in Romania
Gothic architecture in Romania
Hunedoara
Hunyadi family
Reportedly haunted locations in Romania
Buildings and structures in Hunedoara County
Tourist attractions in Hunedoara County
Historic monuments in Hunedoara County
Dracula